Anilios bicolor, also known as the dark-spined blind snake, is a species of blind snake that is endemic to southern Australia. The specific epithet bicolor (“two-coloured”) refers to the snake's appearance.

Description
The species grows to an average of about 42 cm in length.

Behaviour
The species is oviparous.

Distribution and habitat
The snake is found in extreme south-eastern Western Australia, much of southern South Australia, western New South Wales and north-western Victoria. The type locality is Adelaide.

References

External Links

 
bicolor
Snakes of Australia
Reptiles of New South Wales
Reptiles of South Australia
Reptiles of Victoria (Australia)
Reptiles of Western Australia
Taxa named by Wilhelm Peters
Reptiles described in 1858